Nancy Sanford Hughes (born January 8, 1943) is the founder and president of the non-profit StoveTeam International. For her work bringing improved cookstoves to Latin America, Hughes has been honored as a United States White House Champion of Change, and a CNN Hero.

Early life
Hughes was born in Claremont, California and graduated from Whitman College in 1964 with a Bachelor of Arts in English Literature. She married George "Duffy" Hughes in 1971, with whom she has three children.

StoveTeam International

While volunteering with medical missions in Guatemala, Hughes saw the health effects of open-fire cooking firsthand. In response, Hughes contacted experts in the field of improved cook stoves to design a stove for Latin America and founded StoveTeam International in 2008. The charity is a non-profit organization that works to bring improved cook stoves to people in Latin America through its use of public donations, which directly fund the development of stove-building factories, owned and operated by local entrepreneurs.

References 

1943 births
Living people
Whitman College alumni
People from Claremont, California